The Algonquin Nation Programs and Services Secretariat is a tribal council encompassing three Algonquin bands in Quebec, Canada. Its seat is located at Notre-Dame-du-Nord in the Abitibi-Témiscamingue region.

Bands 
The Algonquin Nation Programs and Services Secretariat encompasses three bands:
 Algonquins of Barriere Lake
 Timiskaming First Nation
 Wolf Lake

See also
 Algonquin people
 Tribal council

References

External links
 Tribal Council Detail by Indigenous and Northern Affairs Canada

First Nations in Quebec
Abitibi-Témiscamingue
First Nations governments
Algonquin